Muniba Mazari Baloch (Urdu: منیبہ مزاری; born 3 March 1987, also known as the Iron Lady of Pakistan) is a Pakistani activist, anchor artist, model, singer and motivational speaker. She became the National Ambassador for UN Women Pakistan after being shortlisted in the 100 Inspirational Women of 2015 by BBC. She also made it to the Forbes 30 under 30 list for 2016.

Muniba Baloch is also Pakistan's first model and anchor who uses a wheelchair. She uses a wheelchair due to injuries sustained in a car crash at the age of 21. She appeared as a host on Hum News's social show Main Nahi Hum.

Personal life 
Muniba Mazari baloch is from a Baloch background, belonging to the tribe of Mazari. She was born in Rahim Yar Khan which is in southern Punjab on 3 March 1987. Muniba went to the Army Public School, and later attended college in her native home town for a BFA. At the age of 18, before she could complete her studies, she was married. In 2008, she was involved in a crash, which left her paraplegic.

Crash and recovery 
On 27 February 2008, Muniba and her husband were travelling from Quetta to Rahim Yar Khan. Their car was in a crash, in which she sustained several major injuries, including broken bones in her arm (both radius and ulna), rib-cage, shoulder blade, collarbone and spine. Her lungs and liver were also deeply cut. Moreover, her entire lower body was left paralysed. She was taken to a nearby hospital, which was ill-equipped to deal with such a severe case. She was then moved to a hospital in Rahim Yar Khan, and eventually, she was admitted to the Aga Khan University Hospital, Karachi. Post-surgery, she was left bed-ridden for two years. Physiotherapy started, which helped her recover enough to use a wheelchair.

After treatment for her injuries, Muniba moved to Rawalpindi. In 2011, four years after the crash, Muniba adopted her son, Nael.

Career
Muniba Mazari has gained fame in multiple areas, as an artist, activist, anchor, model, singer and motivational speaker. Most of her career, however, has been built on painting and motivational speaking.

While painting, she found a job working for Areeb Azhar to run his Facebook page for monthly wages. She also started work at her son's school for a startup project called Dheeray Bolo (Speak Slowly), which involved teaching Urdu at various schools. The managing director of Pakistan Television (PTV) at the time, Mohammad Malick, learnt about her because of her TED talk, and asked her to work at PTV. She also worked for Clown Town in September, 2014, which allowed her to work with children and the elderly.

Apart from this, Muniba was chosen by Pond's as the Pond's Miracle Woman. She was also chosen by international hairdressing salon, Toni & Guy, to become the first-ever wheelchair-using model in Asia. Her first campaign for them was called Women of Substance.

Muniba Mazari has been a part of Dil Say Pakistan's campaign to spread the feeling of patriotism and unity in Pakistan. She has performed as a singer for them, including in a YouTube video which was published in August 2017 as part of their Independence Day campaign for that year.

In June 2019, Muniba was appointed by the previous Prime Minister of Pakistan, Imran Khan, to be a part of Pakistan's first ever National Youth Council.

Artist 
Muniba started painting on her hospital bed. Her medium is acrylics on canvas. With the slogan, Let Your Walls Wear Colours, she created her own art brand called Muniba's Canvas.  She has presented her work in exhibitions, including a six-day exhibition held in Lahore from 19 April 2016 to 24 April 2016. This exhibition was held at Collectors Galleria and displayed 27 acrylic paintings.

Her first International exhibition was held in Dubai - entitled And I Choose To Live - at the Pakistan Association Dubai. The two-day exhibition - hosted by the Embassy of Pakistan, Poetic Strokes and The Collectors Galleria, Lahore - was inaugurated by Moazzam Ahmad Khan, the Pakistani ambassador to the UAE.

She has displayed her art in several other exhibitions, as well as for charity, including:

 USEA Art Club, Islamabad (Solo exhibition)
 Nomad Art Gallery (Group exhibition)
 Tribal Heritage Art and Craft Gallery, Islamabad (Group exhibition)
 My Art World Gallery, Islamabad (Group exhibition)
 Worked on a project for the Embassy of United States of America Overseas Buildings Operations, Islamabad
 Australian High Commissioners' Charity Art Exhibition for a Christian school in Rawalpindi
 Exhibition at Serena Hotel, Islamabad, collaborated with National University of Modern Languages
 Collaborated with three artists for an exhibition at Arts Council, Rawalpindi, in 2011
 Took part in a Charity Event for United Nations High Commissioners for Refugees (UNHCR). She also donated a painting to UNHCR and Ministry of Women Development during an exhibition for refugees organized by Islamabad-based SACH (Struggle for Change) NGO

Motivational speaker 
She has participated as a motivational speaker on various fronts, with her first break being TED Talks, Islamabad. Some of her notable works as a speaker include:

 Entrepreneurs' Organization Network, Pakistan
 Motivational speech at Army Public School, Peshawar and Combined Military Hospital, Peshawar. She also sang Ye Watan Tumhara Hai by Mehdi Hassan
 Leader's Summit
 Motivational speech at Bank Alfalah Training Centre, Lahore
 Invited as a guest to Women Entrepreneurship Day at the National University of Sciences & Technology Business School
 Talked about social entrepreneurship at the Youth Alumni Reunion 2014
 Young Presidents’ Organization (YPO)
 VCon Malaysia
 Vcon Dubai

Awards and honors 
 100 Inspirational Women of 2015 (BBC)
500 most influential Muslims of the world
 First Pakistani UN GoodWill Ambassador for UN Women
Forbes 30 Under 30 - 2016
The Karic Brothers Awards 2017 in Serbia by The Karic Foundation

The Karic Brothers Award 

Muniba Mazari received Karic Brothers Award in Belgrade, Serbia under the category of humanitarian services.

References

External links 
Official website

1987 births
Living people
Baloch people
Pakistani motivational speakers
Pakistani people with disabilities
Pakistani women artists
Pakistani women writers
People from Rahim Yar Khan District
People from Islamabad
Pakistani non-fiction writers
People with paraplegia
Pakistani women's rights activists
BBC 100 Women